Geoffrey "Geoff" Pritchard (born 9 December 1966) is a former Australian rules footballer who played with Collingwood in the Victorian Football League (VFL).

Pritchard, a ruckman recruited from Montmorency, played just one senior game for Collingwood. It came in Collingwood's round 18 game against Melbourne at Victoria Park, in the 1986 VFL season.

In 1989, Pritchard joined Port Melbourne.

References

1966 births
Australian rules footballers from Victoria (Australia)
Collingwood Football Club players
Montmorency Football Club players
Port Melbourne Football Club players
Living people